Hafez al-Assad was the President of Syria, who ruled the country since the 1970 Corrective Movement, died from a heart attack on 10 June 2000 at the age of 69. His funeral was held three days later in Damascus, and he was buried in a mausoleum in his hometown Qardaha in Latakia Governorate, beside his eldest son Bassel al-Assad who died in 1994.

He was succeeded by Abdul Halim Khaddam as caretaker president until presidential elections were held. Several national leaders paid tribute as the leader's body lay in state in the People's Palace.

Following Assad's death, 40 days of mourning was declared in Syria and 7 days in Lebanon. Egypt, Jordan, Oman, Palestine, Libya, Iran, Morocco, United Arab Emirates, Yemen, Kuwait and Qatar announced three days of national mourning. His funeral was held three days later.

Illness and death 
President Al-Assad's health began to deteriorate in late 1983 due to his diabetes and varicose veins. He was taken to Al-Shami Hospital in Damascus and placed under intensive care. Then he transferred his powers during his absence to a committee consisting of five members from his close circle.

Funeral

Dignitaries 
States
  President Abdelaziz Bouteflika
  Crown Prince Salman bin Hamad Al Khalifa
  President Jiang Zemin
  President Hosni Mubarak
  Minister of Foreign Affairs Amr Moussa
  President Jacques Chirac
  President Mohammad Khatami
  Vice President Taha Muhie-eldin Marouf
  Minister of Foreign Affairs Yōhei Kōno
  King Abdullah II
  President Emile Lahoud
  Prime Minister Selim Hoss
  Speaker of Parliament Nabih Berri
  Emir Jaber Al-Ahmad Al-Jaber Al-Sabah
  Speaker of Parliament Abdelwahed Radi
  Minister of Foreign Affairs Jozias van Aartsen
  Chairman Yassir Arafat
  Prime Minister Abdullah bin Khalifa Al Thani
  Chairman of the State Duma Gennadiy Seleznyov
  Crown Prince Abdullah
  President Omar Hassan al-Bashir
  President Ahmet Necdet Sezer
  Foreign secretary Robin Cook
  Crown Prince Khalifa bin Zayed Al Nahyan
  Secretary of State Madeleine Albright
  President Ali Abdullah Saleh

Organizations
  President of the European Commission Romano Prodi
  Secretary-General Hassan Nasrallah

Burial 

He was buried in a mausoleum in his hometown Qardaha in Latakia Governorate, beside his eldest son Bassel al-Assad who died in 1994.

See also 
 Hafez al-Assad Government
 Presidency of Hafez al-Assad

References

Works cited
 

Hafez al-Assad
2000 in Syria
Assad, Hafez
21st century in Damascus
June 2000 events in Asia
Assad, Hafez
Assad, Hafez